Mrs. Greenbird is a German folk duo consisting of Sarah Nücken and Steffen Brückner. They are best known for winning season three of the German version of The X Factor.

Career

2006–2012: Formation and early career
Nücken and Brückner met in 2006 in Cologne and formed Mrs. Greenbird. The duo originally called themselves "Goldkehlchen und der Mann mit Hut" comedically before deciding on "Mrs. Greenbird". The name comes from a dead green parrot they found at their home. At the time, Nücken was working as a singer in various choirs while Brückner worked with worship leaders at a church in Cologne. Their first major gig as a duo was the opening act for actor and musician Tim Robbins.

2012–2015: X Factor and breakthrough
In autumn 2012, the duo participated in season three of X Factor. Throughout the show they were known for performing various songs of different genres in their folk style. Several of their covers, including "Frozen" (by Madonna) and "Blitzkrieg Bop" (by The Ramones) went on to chart in Germany and Austria. They performed an original composition "Shooting Stars & Fairy Tales" in the final round of the show and went on to win the competition. The song later charted in Germany, Austria, and Switzerland within the Top 20. On 21 December 2012 they released their début self-titled album which reached the number-one spot in Germany and Top 10 in Austria and Switzerland.

2015–present: Unser Song für Österreich

In January 2015, Mrs. Greenbird was revealed as one of the seven established artists taking part in Unser Song für Österreich. They competed with the songs "Shine Shine Shine" and "Take My Hand" on 5 March 2015, but did not make it to the second round of voting and were eliminated.

Members
 Sarah Nücken (born  in Siegburg) – Singer, songwriter
 Steffen Brückner (born  in Kamp-Lintfort) – Guitarist, singer, songwriter

Discography

Albums

Singles

References

External links

Musical groups established in 2006
2006 establishments in Germany
Columbia Records artists
German folk music groups
German musical duos
The X Factor winners
The X Factor contestants
Folk music duos
Male–female musical duos
Sony Music artists